Fabrizio Suardi or Alessandro Suardi (1585 – April 1638) was a Roman Catholic prelate who served as Bishop of Caserta (1637–1638) and Bishop of Lucera (1619–1637).

Biography
Fabrizio Suardi was born in Naples, Italy in 1585.
On 28 January 1619, he was appointed during the papacy of Pope Paul V as Bishop of Lucera.
On 10 February 1619, he was consecrated bishop by Ladislao d'Aquino, Bishop of Venafro, with Paolo De Curtis, Bishop Emeritus of Isernia, and Scipione Spina, Bishop of Lecce, serving as co-consecrators. 
On 9 February 1637, he was appointed during the papacy of Pope Urban VIII as Bishop of Caserta.
He served as Bishop of Caserta until his death in April 1638.

Episcopal succession
While bishop, he was the principal co-consecrator of:

References

External links and additional sources
 (for Chronology of Bishops)  
 (for Chronology of Bishops)  

17th-century Italian Roman Catholic bishops
Bishops appointed by Pope Paul V
Bishops appointed by Pope Urban VIII
1585 births
1638 deaths